Habib Fatah-Gharalar (born 8 December 1948) is an Iranian wrestler. He competed in the men's freestyle 52 kg at the 1976 Summer Olympics.

References

External links
 

1948 births
Living people
Iranian male sport wrestlers
Olympic wrestlers of Iran
Wrestlers at the 1976 Summer Olympics
Place of birth missing (living people)